, nicknamed Hurricane Ryu, is a Japanese illustrator, comic book author, writer, director, martial artist and an actor. His real name is Hidemi Miyata, born in Tochigi Prefecture.

Comics 
 1980 - Parabola of Ecstasy, Comic DUMP #10, Daya Publishing
 1982 - Mad City 16 Beat, oneshot, Comic Lemon People #1, 1982
 1983 - Gekisatsu! Uchuuken, Comic Lemon People #2-#81, Kubo shoten
 1985 - Blade of Gigantis, Tokyo III Co., Ltd
 1986 - Pretty Executor, Tokyo III Co., Ltd
 1990 - Monster Warrior Godzilla, published in JICC publishing's The Godzilla Comic
 1994 - Giant Monster Gamera, Gekkan Manga Boys, November 1994 - February 1995, Tokuma Shoten.

Books 
 1992 - Godzilla Monster Super Quiz, Kubo shoten
 1995 - Gojira Road, Fujinsha
 1996 - Kaijū baka ichi-dai Gojira yakusha e no michi, Yosensha
 1999 - Men who suitacted tokusatsu heroes, Sony Magazines

Films
As a director
 1987 - Pretty Executor
 1996 - Insatsu seyo! Kyōshinman
 2013 - P Man: Syborg Bishoujo Shirei Kyakuchū
 2014 - Heroine Champion Festival
 2016 Digital Q-ko VS Robocon Great Battle
As an actor
 1991 - Mikadroid: Robokill Beneath Discoclub Layla (Mikadroid)
 Godzilla series
 1991 - Godzilla vs. King Ghidorah (King Ghidorah)
 1992 - Godzilla and Mothra: The Battle for Earth (Battra)
 1993 - Godzilla vs. Mechagodzilla II (Baby Godzilla)
 1995 - Godzilla vs. Destoroyah (Godzilla Junior)
 1992 - UFO Daisakusen Iko-chan Fight (Miracle Man)
 1992 - Den Ace ni Shisu (Den Ace)
 1994 - Yamato Takeru (Kumasogami)
 2003 - Marumi☆Mix Juice (Mister Z)
 2004 - The Calamari Wrestler (Ika Wrestler)
 2005 - Ganso Den Ace (Den Ace)
 2006 - Crab Goalkeeper (Grab Goalkeeper)
 2006 - The World Sinks Except Japan (Den Ace)
 2007 - Den Ace The Final ～Kirakuki ni Ikiyou～
 2008 - The Monster X Strikes Back/Attack the G8 Summit (Guilala)
 2014 - Earth Defence Widow (Bemuras)

External links 
 日記, Hariken Ryu's diary, has not been updated since 2007
 破李拳竜・日記, Hariken Ryu's another diary, similarly has not been updated since 2007
 怪獣バカ一代, Hariken Ryu's current, active diary blog

References

Japanese male film actors
1958 births
Actors from Tochigi Prefecture
Living people
Manga artists from Tochigi Prefecture
People from Tochigi Prefecture
Writers from Tochigi Prefecture